The M21 bus route constitutes a public transit line in Manhattan, New York City. The M21 operates between the West Village and the Lower East Side, serving as a Houston Street crosstown.

Current route 
The M21 bus route begins at Spring St at Hudson St in the West Village. Eastbound buses use Sixth Avenue to access Houston Street, whereas westbound buses use King Street and Washington Street to access the terminus. The M21 stays on Houston Street until Columbia Street. Eastbound buses continue to FDR Drive, and use the service road to access Grand St, where they terminate. Westbound buses then use Lewis St, Delancey St, and Columbia St to access Houston St, where they head back to the West Side.

History

Early history 
The M21 was originally the New York City Department of Plant and Structures bus route M10 – later became NYCO's 21. This route replaced New York Railways' Avenue C Line streetcar on September 21, 1919.

Recent history 
Due to the 2010 budget crisis, the M21's weekend service discontinued on June 27, 2010, in conjunction with an extension to its current terminus at Grand St and FDR Dr. Weekend service was restored on January 6, 2013.

Equipment 
The M21 operates out of Michael J. Quill Depot, using Orion VII NG HEV 07.501, New Flyer XD40 Xcelsior, and New Flyer Xcelsior XDE40 buses. Prior to 2019 and 2022 the route operated Nova Bus RTS-06 and Orion VII Old Gen buses, but these were replaced by the New Flyer XD40 Xcelsiors and New Flyer Xcelsior XDE40's

References

021
M021